Infestation is the state of being invaded or overrun by parasites or other pests.

Infestation may also refer to:

 Infestation (film), a film by American director Kyle Rankin
 Infestation (album), an album by American hard rock band Ratt
 Infestation (comics), a comic book crossover published by IDW Publishing
 Infestation (video game), action-adventure computer game released in 1990
 "Infestation" (Under the Dome), a television episode
 Centipede: Infestation, a top-down shooter video game released in 2011
 Infestation: Survivor Stories, a video game released in 2012, formerly known as The War Z
 The Infestation, a faction in the online game Warframe, described as a techno-organic plague that operates as a hive mind

See also
Infest (disambiguation)